Karami (Arabic كرامي) is an Arabic-based Lebanese surname, particularly that of a famous Lebanese Sunni Muslim political family. It is often francicised in the media as Karamé. It is to be differentiated from the Classical Arabic term Karamah (Arabic كرامة) and its colloquial form, Karameh.

Karami is also a common Persian language surname (Persian کرمی) 

Karami may refer to:

Lebanese political family
Also commonly written as francicized Karamé
 Abdul Hamid Karami (1890–1950), Lebanese political and religious leader
 Ahmad Karami (1944–2020), Lebanese statesman
 Faisal Karami (born 1971), Omar Karami's son, Lebanese minister of Sports and Youth
 Omar Karami (1934–2015), Prime Minister of Lebanon
 Rashid Karami (1921–1987), Lebanese statesman

Iranian-based surname
Based on the Persian surname کرمی
Abdollah Karami (born 1983), Iranian footballer
Mohammad Sadegh Karami (born 1984), Iranian footballer
Mohsen Karami (born 1995), Iranian footballer 
Shahab Karami (born 1991), Iranian footballer 
Yaser Karami (born 1992), Iranian football 
Yousef Karami (born 1983), Iranian Taekwondo athlete

Other people
Khalid Karami (born 1989), Dutch footballer of Moroccan origin 
Miyoko Karami (born 1974), Japanese road cyclist

Language
 Karami language, an extinct and unclassified Papuan language, perhaps a language isolate, of Papua New Guinea.

Places
Rashid Karami Stadium, a Lebanese stadium named after prime minister Rashid Karami
Ali Karami-ye Olya, also known as ‘Alī Karamī, a village in Chenar Rural District, Kabgian District, Dana County, Kohgiluyeh and Boyer-Ahmad Province, Iran
Karreh Karami, a village in Tut-e Nadeh Rural District, in the Central District of Dana County, Kohgiluyeh and Boyer-Ahmad Province, Iran

See also
Karameh (disambiguation) 
Karamah (disambiguation)
Karama (disambiguation)
Karamat (disambiguation)
Karam (disambiguation)